The German Athletics Championships is an annual outdoor competition in the sport of athletics organised by the Deutscher Leichtathletik-Verband (DLV), which serves as the German national championship for the sport. The venue of the championships is decided on an annual basis and several events are hosted separately.

The competition was first held in 1898 and women's events were introduced in 1920. Following the division of Germany, the DLV continued to host a national championship from 1946, which served as the West German Athletics Championships, while a separate East German competition was also established. The all-German championship was re-established in 1991, following the reunification of Germany.

Men

100 metres

200 metres

400 metres

800 metres

1500 metres

5000 metres

10,000 metres

10K run

Half marathon

Marathon

100K run

3000 metres steeplechase

110 metres hurdles

400 metres hurdles

High jump

Pole vault

Long jump

Triple jump

Shot put

Discus throw

Hammer throw

Javelin throw

Decathlon

10,000 metres walk

20 kilometres walk

50 kilometres walk

Cross country

Mountain running

Women

100 metres

200 metres

400 metres

800 metres

1500 metres

5000 metres

10,000 metres

10K run

Half marathon

Marathon

100K run

3000 metres steeplechase

100 metres hurdles

400 metres hurdles

High jump

Pole vault

Long jump

Triple jump

Shot put

Discus throw

Hammer throw

Javelin throw

Pentathlon and heptathlon

5000 metres walk

20 kilometres walk

Cross country

Mountain running

References

Champions 1991–2006
German Championships. GBR Athletics. Retrieved 2021-01-31.

Winners
 List
German Championships
Athletics